The Looking for America Tour was a concert tour by American alternative rock bands Switchfoot and Relient K in support of their albums Where the Light Shines Through and Air for Free. The co-headlining tour spanned 44 dates across the United States from September through November 2016.

References

Further reading
 
 

2016 concert tours
Co-headlining concert tours
Relient K
Switchfoot
Christian concert tours